The Slingsby T.8 Kirby Tutor was a single-seat sport glider produced from 1937, by Fred Slingsby in Kirbymoorside, Yorkshire.

Design and development
The T.8 Kirby Tutor (a.k.a. Taper-wing Kadet) came about at the request of the Midland Gliding Club which wanted a higher performance aircraft to progress to after the T.7 Kirby Kadet. John Sproule adapted the wings from a BAC VII to fit onto the T.7 Kirby Kadet fuselage. The higher-aspect ratio wings gave a measurable increase in performance for minimum cost. Gliding clubs could also elect to buy the wings alone and fit them to Kirby Kadet fuselages as required. Post-war the absence of spoilers was rectified by a modification which was applied to most surviving aircraft.

History
The T.8 Kirby Tutor was immediately popular but only seven complete aircraft were sold before the outbreak of World War II, as well as kits of parts, spares and sets of wings (for retrofit to T.7 Kirby Kadets). The T.8 Tutor was also produced for use by the Air Training Corps, being renamed Slingsby T.8 Cadet TX Mk.2. Sixty-two Cadet TX Mk.2s were ordered from 1944 with simple windscreens and landing wheels. Postwar Slingsby sub-contracted Martin Hearn Ltd. to build 25 new T.7 Kirby Kadets and 25 new T.8 Kirby Tutors as well as about a dozen more at Kirbymoorside. The interchangeability of the components led to many hybrid aircraft having wings and fuselages of all types mixed together. During the 1960s the numbers dwindled, especially when an urgent inspection of the main-spars was called for. The cost of the inspection and resultant rectification work often exceeded the value of the aircraft, with many being withdrawn from use. An example is on display at the Gliding Heritage Centre.

Operators

Air Training Corps

Specifications

See also

References

Notes

Bibliography

Further reading

External links

1930s British sailplanes
Glider aircraft
Kirby Tutor
Aircraft first flown in 1937
Parasol-wing aircraft